Robert Moffat Elton (born September 13, 1932) is a retired United States Army lieutenant general who served as Deputy Chief of Staff G-1 Personnel of The United States Army from 1983 to 1987. He earned a B.S. degree from the United States Military Academy in June 1954 and an M.S. degree in engineering physics from the University of Virginia in 1963.

References

1932 births
Living people
People from Cleveland
United States Military Academy alumni
United States Army Rangers
United States Army personnel of the Vietnam War
Recipients of the Air Medal
Recipients of the Silver Star
University of Virginia School of Engineering and Applied Science alumni
Recipients of the Meritorious Service Medal (United States)
Recipients of the Legion of Merit
United States Army generals